Malegia is a genus of leaf beetles in the subfamily Eumolpinae. It is known from Africa, Asia and the Caucasus.

Species

 Malegia affinis Jacoby, 1898
 Malegia alluaudi Pic, 1903
 Malegia arabica Daccordi, 1979
 Malegia asiatica Pic, 1894
 Malegia atritarsis Pic, 1931
 Malegia bicoloripes Pic, 1936
 Malegia colchica Reitter, 1912
 Malegia contracta (Fairmaire, 1886)
 Malegia hauseri Pic, 1902
 Malegia laticollis Pic, 1921
 Malegia latipennis Pic, 1901
 Malegia letourneuxi Lefèvre, 1883
 Malegia maculata Pic, 1909
 Malegia nigritarsis Pic, 1950
 Malegia obscurella Lefèvre, 1883
 Malegia olivacea Pic, 1941
 Malegia pallidipes Pic, 1904
 Malegia robusta Achard, 1914
 Malegia striatula Lefèvre, 1883
 Malegia vadoni Pic, 1950

Species moved to other genera:
 Malegia aenea (Chen, 1940): moved to Lahejia
 Malegia brunnea Tan, 1992: moved to Trichotheca
 Malegia jacobsoni Sumakow, 1901: moved to Lahejia

References

Eumolpinae
Chrysomelidae genera
Beetles of Africa
Beetles of Asia
Beetles of Europe
Taxa named by Édouard Lefèvre